The 2009–10 Liga III season was the 54th season of Liga III, the third tier of the Romanian football league system. The season started on August 21, 2009 and ended on June 4, 2010.

The winners of each division got promoted to the 2010–11 Liga II season.

The bottom six from each division were relegated at the end of the season to the county football leagues (Liga IV). From the 12th placed teams, another one was relegated. To determine this team, separate standings were computed, using only the games played against the clubs ranked 1st through 11th.

Team changes

To Liga III
Relegated from Liga II
 Liberty Salonta**
 Buftea**
 Știința Bacău
 ACU Arad
 Progresul București
 Prefab Modelu
 FCM Târgoviște
 Forex Brașov
 Mechel Câmpia Turzii

From Liga III
Promoted to Liga II
 Râmnicu Sărat
 Steaua București II
 Victoria Brănești
 Gaz Metan CFR Craiova
 Fortuna Covaci
 Baia Mare
 Tricolorul Breaza
 Silvania Șimleu Silvaniei
 Săgeata Stejaru**

Note (**)
CS Buftea sold its Liga II place to third tier club Săgeata Stejaru.

Liberty Salonta withdrew at the end of the season from Liga II, CFR Timișoara, which initially relegated, was spared from relegation.

League tables

Seria I

Seria II

Seria III

Seria IV

Seria V

Seria VI

See also

 2009–10 Liga I
 2009–10 Liga II
 2009–10 Liga IV

References

Liga III seasons
3
Romania